The Labor Party is a socialist political party in South Korea.

History

After the New Progressive Party and the Socialist Party voted to unite in 2012, the Labor Party was officially formed the following year. It held its interim party congress on 21 July 2013.

On 5 February 2022, it was announced that the unregistered Socialist Revolutionary Workers' Party agreed to merge with the Labor Party in order to create a unified socialist vision for the 2022 South Korean presidential election under candidate Lee Baek-yoon.

Ideologies and political positions
The Labor Party is a political party led by the Minjungminju (PD) faction, a non-nationalist left-wing tendency. The Labor Party officially supports "definitely left-wing politics", "environmentalism" and "democratic socialism". LP also showed a center-left social democratic character until it absorbed the Socialist Revolutionary Workers' Party. Major Labor politicians are critical of "liberal politics" (mainly seen in the Democratic, Justice, and Progressive Parties), and hold that true progressivism is only possible through socialism. LP envisions the realization of "socialist politics" beyond 'left-liberal politics' and 'conservative politics' that have dominated South Korean politics.

A Labor Party major politician, Lee Gap-yong, has critiqued the Progressive Party and Justice Party for not being truly "progressive". According to him, the Progressive Party, classified as far-left in the South Korean political context, has "given up" socialism. (However, unlike the Progressive Party, the Labor Party is not classified as far-left because it has a critical tendency toward North Korea.)

Leadership

Hong Sehwa and An Hyo-sang, 2012
Kim Jong-cheol, 2012 (acting)
Kim Il-ung, 2012–2013
Lee Yong-gill, 2013–2015
Na Gyung-che, 2015
Choe Seung-hyeon, 2015 (acting)
Kim Sang-cheol, 2015
Koo Kyo-hyun, 2015–2016
Kim Gang-ho, 2016 (acting)
Lee Gap-yong, 2016–2018
Na Do-won, 2018-2019 (acting)
Shin Ji-hae, Yong Hae-in, 2019
Hyun Lin, 2019 (acting)
Hyun Lin, 2019–2021
Na Do-won, 2021–2022
Na Do-won, Yi Jong-hoe, 2022–present

Election results

President

Legislature

Local

See also

 Pak Noja
 Park Eun-ji
 Progressivism in South Korea
 Socialism in South Korea
 Justice Party (South Korea)
 Basic Income Party

References

External links
  

 
Political parties in South Korea
Democratic socialist parties in Asia
Immigration political advocacy groups in South Korea
Left-wing parties in South Korea
Progressive parties in South Korea
Socialism in South Korea